Mow Cop Castle is a folly at Mow Cop in the civil parish of Odd Rode, Cheshire, England.  It is recorded in the National Heritage List for England as a designated Grade II listed building. The ridge, upon which the castle sits, forms the boundary between the counties of Cheshire and Staffordshire, the dioceses of Chester and Lichfield and the ecclesiastical provinces of Canterbury and York.

History
Traces of a prehistoric camp have been found here. In 1754, Randle Wilbraham of nearby Rode Hall built an elaborate summerhouse looking like a medieval fortress and round tower.

The area around the castle was nationally famous for the quarrying of high-quality millstones ('querns') for use in water mills. Excavations at Mow Cop have found querns dating back to the Iron Age.

The Castle was given to the National Trust in 1937. The same year over ten thousand Methodists met on the hill to commemorate the first Primitive Methodist camp meeting there.

Though visitors were originally allowed inside the folly, the area surrounding it has been fenced off due to several suicide attempts and one suicide on the ledge. On the turn of the millennium in the year 2000, a large fire was lit beside the folly as part of a network of communicating beacons across the country.

Mow Cop and its folly are central images in Alan Garner's novel Red Shift.

See also

Listed buildings in Kidsgrove
Listed buildings in Odd Rode

References

External links
 History of Mow Cop

National Trust properties in Cheshire
Tourist attractions in Cheshire
Tourist attractions of the Peak District
Folly castles in England
Ruins in Cheshire
Folly buildings in England
Grade II listed buildings in Staffordshire